Don't Take It to Heart is a 1944 British comedy film directed by Jeffrey Dell and starring Richard Greene, Alfred Drayton, Patricia Medina, Moore Marriott and Richard Bird.

It was shot at the Riverside Studios in Hammersmith with sets designed by the art director Alex Vetchinsky.

Plot
When the ancient castle of the Earls of Chaunduyt (pronounced "Condit") is damaged by German bombing during the Second World War, an ancient ghost is released from a chest hidden in an old wall. He is sighted by the butler Alfred Bucket and the maid when they come to inspect the damage, and he becomes front page news. Lawyer  Peter Hayward joins a tour of the somewhat decrepit castle (conducted by the poverty-stricken, but unconcerned Lord Chaunduyt), and admires portraits of a young woman, who turns out to be Lady Mary, the present lord's daughter.

When Peter comes to look at manuscripts that were also uncovered by the bombing, he is pleasantly surprised to find that his lordship has forgotten the appointment, but Lady Mary has returned home and can be persuaded to assist him. (She has socialist tendencies and is engaged to commoner George Bucket, much to her snobbish aunt's displeasure.) They spend much time together; after a week, Peter asks Mary if she was only trying to help sell the manuscripts. She admits it is important to her father, then tells him she has to go away the next day when he makes it clear he is attracted to her. When Peter asks when she found out, she tells him it was half a minute ago.

In the local pub, the ghost tries to engage a somewhat inebriated Peter to take on a case after Pike ploughs up a cricket pitch; over 400 years, his conscience has grown to bother him that he fenced in land that did not belong to him.

When Mary returns, she finds Peter still there. She then tells him that her fiance, whom she has seen only once briefly since they were children, is coming home from the war. Discouraged, Peter decides to leave. At the railway station, he learns that Pike has confiscated the land Harry used to operate a brickyard, probably out of spite for losing the case over the cricket grounds, and now people are saying that he is responsible. At a party, Mary inadvertently learns that George is engaged to someone else, which makes her distraught. However, she pulls herself together when Peter appears; she continues to discourage his romantic interest in her.

Meanwhile, Peter concocts a plan. He has some of the local residents move sheep onto the confiscated land. When Pike takes the matter to court, presided over by Lord Chaunduyt, Peter pleads not guilty for himself and all of the other defendants. Pike is represented by Sir Henry Wade and Patterson. Peter proceeds to contend that the recently discovered manuscripts prove the Lord Chaunduyt who enclosed the land originally was not in fact Lord Chaunduyt at all. Peter calls Dr. Rose of the British Museum as his first witness. He confirms the authenticity of the manuscripts and reads a paragraph which contains a deathbed confession that a man switched his child with the infant Lord Chaunduyt. Peter then asserts that the rightful earl is poacher Harry Bucket! Sir Henry demands that Peter produce a witness to the signature. The ghost unexpectedly appears, takes the witness stand and confirms that the signature is that of his father. The case is dismissed.

Harry is made Lord Chaunduyt by act of Parliament. Peter confesses to Mary that his aged father is a baronet and overcomes her outrage with a kiss. Meanwhile, the former earl enjoys himself by poaching.

Cast
 Richard Greene as Peter Hayward
 Alfred Drayton as [Joseph] Pike
 Patricia Medina as Mary
 Moore Marriott as Granfer
 Richard Bird as Arthur [Chaunduyt] / the ghost
 Edward Rigby as Butler [Alfred Bucket]
 Brefni O'Rorke as Lord [Charles] Chaunduyt
 Wylie Watson as Harry Bucket
 Claude Dampier as Loopy
 Ernest Thesiger as Justices' Clerk
 Ronald Squire as Music-Lover
 Joyce Barbour as Harriet
 David Horne as Sir Henry [Wade]
 Joan Hickson as Mrs. Pike
 Claude Bailey as Magistrate
 Ivor Barnard as Bus-Driver
 Esma Cannon as Maid
 Peter Cotes as Junior Counsel [Patterson]
 Patric Curwen as Smith
 Harry Fowler as Telegraph Boy
 Arthur Hambling as Railway Porter
 Ernest Jay as Reporter [Tripp]
 Edie Martin as Postmistress
 George Merritt as Landlord
 John Salew as Dr. Rose, witness
 John Turnbull as Police Sergeant
 Amy Veness as Cook
 Margaret Withers as Mrs. Smith
 Eliot Makeham as Roberts
 Ian Wilson as Reporter in Court

Production
The film was made at Riverside Studios, Hammersmith in London, England, and on location. A collection of location stills and corresponding contemporary photographs is hosted at reelstreets.com.

Critical reception
Allmovie described it as "an amiable entry in the 1940s cycle of "ghost comedies"...Don't Take It to Heart received almost uniformly good reviews from the British press, which during wartime was often resistant to comedy films" ; and TV Guide wrote, "the talented leads are supported by a fine cast of character actors."

References

External links
 

1944 films
1944 comedy films
British comedy films
British ghost films
Films directed by Jeffrey Dell
Films produced by Sydney Box
Films set in 1944
Films set in England
Two Cities Films films
Films shot at Riverside Studios
British black-and-white films
1940s English-language films
1940s British films